Hendrik "Hent" de Vries (born 24 February 1958, is a Dutch philosopher, Professor of German, Religious Studies, and Comparative Literature and Affiliated Professor of Philosophy at New York University, and Professor of Philosophy at the University of Amsterdam. De Vries has been instrumental in explaining the apophatic and other theological claims and dimensions of deconstruction and for demonstrating its import for an understanding of religion in contemporary philosophy and culture.

Selected bibliography

Books

Chapters in books

Journal articles

References

1958 births
Living people
20th-century Dutch philosophers
21st-century Dutch philosophers
Johns Hopkins University faculty
Academic staff of the University of Amsterdam
University of Amsterdam alumni
People from Uitgeest